James Kirby Minter (born November 23, 1929 – August 11, 2009) was an American basketball player. At a height of 6'6" (1.98 m) tall, he played at the forward position. He was inducted into the Durant Athletic Hall of Fame in 2007. In the city of Durant, Oklahoma, January 4 has been named, "Kirby Minter Day".

College career
Minter, who was born in Marietta, Oklahoma, attended and graduated from Durant High School in 1947, where he also played high school basketball. After high school, Minter played College basketball at Southeastern Oklahoma State University, with the Savage Storm, from 1947 to 1950.

National team career
As a member of a Peoria Caterpillars AAU team, which was composed of the Caterpillar company's employees, he represented the United States men's national basketball team at the 1954 FIBA World Championship, and he was named the Most Valuable Player of the competition. Minter scored a total of 100 points (11.1 points per game) during the tournament.

Death
Minter died on August 11, 2009, in Oklahoma City.

References

External links
Basketpedya.com

1929 births
2009 deaths
Basketball players from Oklahoma
People from Durant, Oklahoma
People from Marietta, Oklahoma
Peoria Caterpillars players
Southeastern Oklahoma State Savage Storm men's basketball players
United States men's national basketball team players
American men's basketball players
FIBA World Championship-winning players
Forwards (basketball)
1954 FIBA World Championship players